Claudia Carolina Fajardo Rodríguez (Cortés Department, 26 September 1985) is a Honduran sport shooter. At the 2012 Summer Olympics, she competed in the Women's 10 metre air pistol. Fajardo Rodriguez reached a 48th rank in the qualification round and failed to qualify for the final.

References

1985 births
People from Cortés Department
Honduran female sport shooters
Living people
Olympic shooters of Honduras
Shooters at the 2012 Summer Olympics
Shooters at the 2015 Pan American Games
Pan American Games competitors for Honduras